Sarat Kumar Mukhopadhyay (15 August 1931 – 21 December 2021) was an Indian Bengali poet, translator and novelist.

Life and career
Sarat Kumar Mukhopadhyay was born in Puri, Bihar and Orissa Province (British India), on 15 August 1931. He graduated from the Calcutta University and became a Chartered Accountant from the Institute of Chartered Accountants of India (ICAI). He continued with his professional studies and became a holder of the Company Secretary certificate from the Institute of Company Secretaries of India (ICSI). He took a break from his working life and went on to study management from the British Institute of Management in Glasgow (United Kingdom). His first book of poetry, Sonar Harin (The Golden Deer) was published in 1957. He was one of the four post-Modernist legendary poets of Krittibas magazine of Kolkata. His first novel Sahabas was published in the Desh and at that time the novel created a lot of controversy among the readers about wife-swapping. He worked as a counsellor in the Creative Writing Programme of the Indira Gandhi National Open University. In 2008 Mukhopadhyay received the Sahitya Akademi Award for his book Ghumer Borir Moto Chand. An anthology of his poems was translated to English by Robert McNamara as The Cat Under the Stairs. He died of a cardiac arrest in the early hours of 21 December 2021, at the age of 90.

References

1931 births
2021 deaths
Bengali Hindus
20th-century Bengalis
21st-century Bengalis
Bengali writers
Bengali poets
Bengali male poets
Bengali novelists
Recipients of the Sahitya Akademi Award in Bengali
University of Calcutta alumni
20th-century Indian writers
20th-century Indian male writers
20th-century Indian translators
20th-century Indian novelists
20th-century Indian poets
21st-century Indian writers
21st-century Indian male writers
21st-century Indian poets
21st-century Indian novelists
21st-century Indian translators
Indian male poets
Indian male writers
Indian male novelists
Indian poets
Indian novelists
Indian translators
Poets from West Bengal
People from Puri
Writers from Kolkata